The Transformers: Generation 2 (also known as Generation Two or G2) was a Transformers toy line that ran from 1992–1995, in conjunction with a corresponding comic book series and edited reruns of the original cartoon beginning in 1993. The prior Transformer television series, comic books and toys became known as 'Generation 1' or G1 retroactively, and are now officially referred to as such by toymaker Hasbro. Generation 2 was discontinued as the first Beast Wars: Transformers toys began hitting the shelves.

Toy line
Generation 2 Transformers toys were, for the first few months, reissued versions of G1 toys from the 1980s. Some of them were given new spring-powered missile launchers or electronic accessories with flashing lights and sounds, and many of them sported new, vivid color schemes. The trade dress for the toy line included a new logo with alternate Autobot and Decepticon symbols.

Because the G1 toys released during G2 represented only a small fraction of the existing G1 toy line, many of the characters featured in the show did not have G2 counterparts in stores. The fact that many of the color schemes were radically altered meant that these characters no longer matched their animated counterparts. The first new molds were introduced in 1993, first with Megatron in a new tank mode, and later with entirely new characters, including European toys that had never been offered in America.

Another type of toy was the video game market: Argonaut Games had made a deal to make a video game based upon the TV series of the same name. The game was to use the Super FX chip, an enhancement chip for the SNES that allowed 3D games to be much more possible. The game was cancelled in development, and was thought to be transferred over to another Super FX game, Vortex (video game), which had a robot morphing into various vehicles. After an interview with Retro Gamer, it was said Vortex and Generation 2 were completely separate.

In 1995, the final year of Generation 2 saw many of the toys in its line packaged on cards that did not carry the "Generation 2" subtitle under the Transformers name. The two most prominent lines under this banner were the Cyberjets and the Go-Bots (using a trademark acquired by Hasbro from Tonka).  The Go-Bots were 1:64 scale cars (compatible with some Hot Wheels and Matchbox tracks) with working axles that transformed into equally small robots. There were initially six different Go-Bot styles produced, all of which were eventually given new colors and were assigned the names of G1 characters. The Cyberjets were small jet planes with missile launchers, and among the first Transformers to incorporate snap-together ball-and-socket articulated joints for the robot mode. There were three designs available in a total of six styles, three Autobots and three Decepticons. Two of the Autobot Cyberjets (Jetfire and Strafe) were decorated with G2 Decepticon symbols on their tail fins.

A number of toys were planned for G2 for which prototypes were created, but were never sold as part of the G2 toy line. Some of these toys were revisited in later lines like Machine Wars and Robots in Disguise, in which the toys were offered under the Flipchangers and Spychangers assortments.

Comic books
Marvel Comics produced a gritty, twelve-issue Transformers: Generation 2 comic book series. Produced early in the toy line, it features a few new Generation 2 characters, as well as many characters from the original series. The story concerned a form of Transformers, who called themselves Cybertronians, having evolved past Autobot or Decepticon. There was also an overarching enemy, The Swarm, which was slowly approaching the Earth, threatening all Transformers in its path. In his search to discover the nature of the enemy, Optimus Prime went into the matrix, discovering that the Swarm was actually a by product of an early form of Transformer reproduction. In the UK, a five-issue Transformers: Generation 2 comic was published by Fleetway. While the first two issues featured exclusive UK material, the last three issues featured reprinted stories from the US comic.

As a part of the Generation 2 line, several characters were given new forms, such as Megatron becoming a tank, due to the efforts of Cobra in Marvel's G.I. Joe: A Real American Hero #139. New characters appeared briefly towards the end of the series, including the Rotor Force, Laser Rods, and the Combat Hero edition of Optimus Prime.

In Japan, both TV Magazine story pages and mini-comics packaged with toys told a different G2 story. Set in the animated series' timeline (specifically after the end of Battlestars: Return of Convoy and therefore Operation Combination), the story tells of a true time of peace between Autobots and Decepticons, known as the Cybertron Alliance, until human soldiers accidentally kill one of Megatron's most loyal followers, causing for him to upgrade to his "Combat Hero" form and causing the war to start yet again. The story also featured a fairly bleak storyline and an art style somewhat similar to the Marvel comics, but was different by focusing more on the "new mold" characters (i.e.: The Laser Rods, Laser Cycles, and Cyberjets) and introducing things such as a Reconfiguration Matrix, which allowed Prime to change from his Hero form to his Laser form after nearly being fatally wounded in battle against Megatron. The story ends with Laser Optimus Prime defeating Megatron, who then leads the Decepticons into space after his defeat, while Prime himself is aided off of the battlefield, wounded, but victorious.

Dreamwave comics, who produced several Transformers titles, had several Generation 2 characters make cameos in their stories including the Turbomasters and Axelerators. (Although technically the Turbomasters were released in Europe at the end of Generation 1, they were re-released in Generation 2.) IDW, the current Transformers license holder, has also had several Generation 2 characters appear in their comics, including Skram, Deluge and Leadfoot.

Animated television series
The only new footage produced in association with G2 was a series of primitive CGI sequences used for the Hasbro toy commercials (making it one of the earliest computer animated series, predating ReBoot) and an advertisement for the Marvel Comics title. A Transformers: Generation 2 television series did air, but it was a rebroadcast of the original Generation 1 Transformers series, using the Marvel Comics commercial as the main title sequence and incorporating CGI footage from the toy commercials for use as the commercial bumpers. New computer-animated scene transitions were superimposed upon the existing cel animation, with footage occasionally slowed down at the end of each act to mask the original fadeout.

Some of the episodes were slightly abridged. For example, the first episode has the entire sequence of acquiring data from Earth vehicles in order to repair the Autobots and Decepticons omitted, instead cutting from the "Explore. Explore." scene to the "Repair. Repair." scene.

The original stories were presented as though they were recordings of historical events by the Cybernet Space Cube. The contention was that the cube would display scenes from the series on its six sides, spinning around to a new face of the cube during scene transitions. This replaced the classic spinning Autobot and Decepticon logos originally used as scene bumpers.

Some of the Generation 2 versions of the episodes have been released in the United Kingdom as region 2 DVDs. Simply entitled "Transformers: Generation 2" the DVD featured the episodes "More Than Meets The Eye" parts 1–3, "S.O.S. Dinobots," and "Heavy Metal War." The DVD was available alongside DVD compilations of miscellaneous original G1 episodes. These early DVD releases were eventually supplanted by Generation 1 DVD volumes, and later complete season boxed sets.

Episodes 
Generation 2 episodes were all taken from the Generation 1 television series, which had been previously produced, but with added effects and editing. These episodes aired between 1993 and 1995.

References

Sources

External links
Alignment – Simon Furman's prose conclusion to the Generation 2 comic book and overall, the Marvel Comics continuity
Includes scans of the second UK exclusive Transformers Generation 2 Fleetway UK comic
Includes scans of the first UK exclusive Transformers Generation 2 Fleetway UK comic

1990s American animated television series
1990s American science fiction television series
1992 American television series debuts
1994 American television series endings
American computer-animated television series
American children's animated space adventure television series
Anime-influenced Western animated television series
English-language television shows
Television series by Claster Television
Television series by Hasbro Studios
Television series set in the 1980s
Television shows set in the United States
Generation 2
Generation 2